Trepp is a Germanic surname that may refer to
Gunda Trepp (born 1958), German author and journalist
Hans-Martin Trepp (1922–1970), Swiss ice hockey player
Leo Trepp (1913–2010), German-born American rabbi 
Max Trepp (1924–1990), Swiss Olympic sprinter
Willy Trepp (born 1938), Swiss track cyclist